The 1984 World Championship Tennis circuit was one of the two rival professional male tennis circuits of 1984. It was organized by World Championship Tennis (WCT). 
The WCT circuit withdrew from the Grand Prix circuit in 1982 and established its own full calendar season consisting of 20 tournaments. For the 1983 season the WCT circuit was downsized to eight tournaments and ran from January to May. The circuit was again downsized for the 1984 season to five tournaments and the best twelve competitors played at the WCT Finals in Dallas. This was the final year of the WCT as a separate tennis circuit.

Calendar

See also
 1984 Grand Prix circuit

References

External links
 ATP 1984 results archive

 
World Championship Tennis circuit seasons
World Championship Tennis